Roslyn Louise Bygrave (born 1955) is an Australian singer-songwriter.

Life and career
Roslyn Louise Bygrave grew up in the small town of Willaura in the Western District of Victoria and later attended secondary school and art school in Ballarat and Melbourne, majoring in painting and printmaking.

Her career as a professional musician began in 1974 when she began performing in Ballarat then circa 1977 on the Bellarine Peninsula (early band: The Salty Dogs; Blue Grass, Reggae, eclectic ). Bygrave later joined the Goanna Band, rising to prominence as keyboardist, vocalist and songwriter alongside Shane Howard and Marcia Howard in the early 1980s. The band recorded three albums and toured extensively, performing in some of the remotest areas of Australia and forging strong bonds with Aboriginal people and their culture. Their debut album, Spirit of Place, won the Australian Recording Industry Association (ARIA) Best Album of the Year award in 1982, with "Solid Rock" winning Best Single of the Year. They also won the Best new Band category. Her songwriting debut on that album was a haunting ballad called "On the Platform"; the 'B' side to the single "Solid Rock".

In 1986 she toured briefly playing reggae, jazz and blues with Australian singer Wendy Saddington with Mick Liber on guitar, Angelica Booth on bass, Javier Fredis on congas and Dezzy McKenna on drums.

Bygrave issued a solo single, "Maybe Midnight", in June 1989 and commenced work on a solo album but nothing eventuated due to artist management difficulties. Bygrave began performing solo in 1991 and worked as a sought after session musician. Around early 1990 she worked with Yothu Yindi's Mandawuy and Gurrumal Yunupingu as vocal collaborator and coach and sang backing vocals on tracks from their first album, Tribal Voice, including the song "Treaty" (the first Aboriginal song to make it onto the Australian music charts and achieve international recognition). From the late 1990s she toured with Deb Byrne as keyboardist and backing vocalist on several of Byrne's tours around Australia promoting Byrne's foray into country music. Other musicians on that tour were Paul Gildea (Little River Band and Ice House) on guitar, Chris Bekker (James Reyne, Ross Wilson) on bass and backing vocals, Davy Porter on drums and James Uluave on percussion and backing vocals.

From 1998 to 2000, Bygrave contributed several songs to the Australian Broadcasting Corporation television series SeaChange.

Goanna reprised with a third album, Spirit Returns, in 1998, to which Bygrave contributed three songs. The album was released at the Melbourne Concert Hall as part of the 1999 Melbourne International Festival Program.
Between 1998 and 1999 Bygrave was involved as a mentor in the Aboriginal Song Lines program which fostered emerging indigenous musicians.

In mid-1999, Bygrave produced and released her first solo album White Bird. Four of the songs were added to compilation CDs and America's Mollie O'Brien recorded one of the songs and two songs received extensive Radio AirPlay. Musicians featured were Kerryn Tolhurst Lap Steel ( The Dingoes and Country Radio), Paul Gildea; Guitars, Shane Howard; Acoustic Guitar and vocals plus co-write on Big Blue Sky, Archie Cuthbertson; Drums, Dave Steel; Harmonica, Mandolin, Marcia Howard; Backing vocals, Michael Santamaria; Irish Whistles.

In 2000 at the Woodford Folk Festival, Bygrave was invited to be the soloist with the choir (directed by Kavisha Mazzella) during the famous fire event. This was broadcast live to 1.5 billion people on a worldwide link via the BBC.

In 2001 she released her second solo album, Walking Home. Musicians featured included Lyndsay Field (John Farnham) on backing vocals, Tony Hicks on soprano sax, Tony Floyd on drums, Chris Bekker on bass, Sam See (Stockley, See and Mason, John Farnham, Steve Vizard Show) on guitar and Marcia Howard on backing vocals.

In 2002, Bygrave performed as the support act for Luka Bloom on his Australian National tour.

In December that year she initiated a major Benefit Concert called 'Bridges to Bali' to raise money for the Balinese victims of the terrorist attack. She collaborated with Promoter Sandy Merrigan at Deacon University to produce the event which featured artists including Ross Wilson, Goanna, Dave Steel, Tiffany Eckhardt, Git, Paul Williamson's Hammond Combo, Marcia Howard and members of the Balinese community in Geelong. This concert was broadcast from Costa Hall to the Asia Pascific Region and Australia via Radio National and Local ABC and was hosted by Paul Petran and Derrek Guille. Substantial money raised from the event was distributed in Bali by Rotary Australia.

From 2003 to 2004, she continued her work as a musical mentor/Artist in residence with troubled young people in regional Australia, where she tutored in songwriting, arranging, recording and the collaborative process. She supported Dennis Locorriere and Paul Brady on their respective National tours.

In 2006 Bygrave initiated and worked with Victorian regional communities producing six free concerts in drought effected regions. Ten musicians including Dave Steel, Tiffany Eckhardt, Pete Denehy, Damian Howard, Tony O'Neill, John Emry, Marcia Howard, John Edgar, Allan O'Conner and others musicians from local communities played 5-hour concerts to people experiencing extreme hardship due to drought.

Some of Bygrave's songs have also selected for use on various soundtracks. In 2009 she released a third solo album, North, which was released at the Port Fairy Folk Festival. The songs on the acclaimed CD arose out of travels to Japan, Italy and India where she performed at The University of Calcutta and The Vishnu Bharati University of the Arts in West Bengal. Musicians on that CD included Chris Bekker; Bass, Tony O'Neill; Mandolin, Guitar and Fiddle; Hilton Winneki; Percussion, Dave Steel; mandolin and Slide Guitar. With cameo backing vocals on 'The Mission Yard' by Shane, Marcia and Damian Howard.

In 2011, Rose collaborated with long-time friend and Goanna member Marcia Howard, to produce a CD called Pearl. The CD was written and recorded by them at their respective home studios and once again launched at Port Fairy Folk Festival to capacity crowds. The Pigram Brothers and Damian Howard make a guest appearance on vocals ( Steve Pigram on Guitar ) on Rose's song 'Universe', and Lee Morgan contributes guitar on several tracks. Howard and Bygrave continued to work together with Jon Emry playing Drums, Isaac Barter- Bass and Matiss Schubert on Mandolin and Fiddle.

In 2014 Bygrave wrote and arranged the anthemic song Carry Memory, for a 60 piece Choir from the Geelong region. This project culminated in a performance of the song at Sunset, to a large audience in the YouYang Mountains near Geelong, Victoria. The song was commissioned by The City of Greater Geelong as part of the Mouth2Mountain Song Lines inaugural community arts program directed by Meme McDonald. The song was recorded with the Choir in 2014 as part of the sound -track to that event.

In 2015 Bygrave was invited by long time friend and legendary Aboriginal musician Bart Willoughby, to perform as part of his band on his 'We Still Live On' tour. The performance centred around Willoughby's exploration of his songs played by him on the Grand Organ. Rose contributed vocals and keyboards during this tour and backing vocals on the corresponding CD. Deline Brisco and Bart; Lead Vocals.

Rose Bygrave has been playing music all her life; professionally for over 40 years. She is renowned for compassionate songwriting – reflecting on the land, love, and especially issues of indigenous and social justice – and her voice, songs and musicianship are regarded as among the best and most 'emotionally spiritual' in Australian contemporary music.( Her songs cross genres; Country, Contemporary Folk, Jazz, Blues, Rock and World....).

Further to studying Art in the 1970s, she has designed all the CD art work and visuals associated with her music and continues to paint.

Bygrave lives in Queenscliff, Victoria with her husband, multi award-winning writer and poet Barry Hill.

Solo discography

Singles
 Maybe Midnight/Protection – Mercury (8724927) (1986)

Albums
 White Bird – Black Market (RB001) (1999)
 Walking Home – Black Market (RB002) (2001)
 North – Black Market (RB003) (2 December 2009)
 Pearl <small>(with Marcia Howard) – Independent MGM (2 June 2011)
 The Yabby Catcher (Jan 2019)

References
 Singer sings a thousand prayers – (8 Oct 2000) Sunday Herald Sun (Melbourne), Look Hear, pg. 099
 The genuine article (Profile: Rose Bygrave) by Martin Flanagan – (26 Feb 2000) The Age (Melbourne) Saturday Extra, pg. 3

External links
 
 

1955 births
Living people
Australian women singer-songwriters